Paalige Bandadde Panchamrutha is a 1963 Indian Kannada film, directed by M. B. Ganesh Singh and produced by K. Krishnaswamy. The film stars Dikki Madhava Rao, Prathima Devi and Saraswathi in the lead roles. The film has musical score by A. R. K. Swamy.

Cast
 Dikki Madhava Rao
 Prathima Devi
 Saraswathi

References

1963 films
1960s Kannada-language films